Patricia Josephine Ferguson (born 24 September 1958, Glasgow) is a Scottish Labour Party politician who was the Member of the Scottish Parliament (MSP) for Glasgow Maryhill constituency from 1999 until 2011 and for Glasgow Maryhill and Springburn from 2011 until 2016.

Background

Ferguson was educated at Garnethill Convent Secondary School in Glasgow between 1970 and 1976, and at Glasgow College of Technology, where she obtained an HNC in Public Administration in 1978. She spent part of her childhood living in the city's Red Road Flats.

Prior to entering the Scottish Parliament, she worked as a health service administrator between 1978 and 1990, with the Scottish Trades Union Congress between 1990 and 1994, and with the Scottish Labour Party between 1994 and 1999.

Member of the Scottish Parliament

She was first elected as an MSP in 1999 for the newly created Glasgow Maryhill constituency, a seat she held until 2011 when Glasgow Maryhill was merged with other constituencies to form the Glasgow Maryhill and Springburn constituency. She won the 2011 Glasgow Maryhill and Springburn election but lost her seat in 2016 to SNP member Bob Doris.

After being elected as MSP for Glasgow Maryhill in May 1999, she was Deputy Presiding Officer of the Scottish Parliament from 1999 until 2001 and as a member of several of the Parliament's Standards and Procedures Committees.

She was first appointed to the Scottish Executive Cabinet in November 2001 as Minister for Parliament when Jack McConnell became First Minister. She became Minister for Tourism, Culture and Sport in October 2004.

In 2006, her name was included on a variant of a Nigerian scam email after a high-profile trip to Malawi as part of her Scottish Executive brief.

Local Government
In the 2022 Glasgow City Council election, Ferguson was one of four members (including Labour colleague Paul Carey) elected to represent the Drumchapel/Anniesland ward.

Personal life

She is married to former Labour MSP Bill Butler.

References

External links
 
Patricia Ferguson Personal website
Patricia Ferguson Biography at Labour party website

Living people
Scottish trade unionists
Maryhill
Alumni of Glasgow Caledonian University
Members of the Scottish Parliament for Glasgow constituencies
Labour MSPs
Members of the Scottish Parliament 1999–2003
Members of the Scottish Parliament 2003–2007
Members of the Scottish Parliament 2007–2011
Members of the Scottish Parliament 2011–2016
Deputy Presiding Officers of the Scottish Parliament
Ministers of the Scottish Government
Women members of the Scottish Government
20th-century Scottish women politicians
Women councillors in Glasgow
Scottish Labour councillors
1958 births